Some is a 2004 South Korean crime thriller film directed by Chang Yoon-hyun.

Plot
The film is about a rookie cop who teams up with a female reporter to investigate drug trafficking and police corruption.

Cast
Go Soo ... Kang Seong-ju
Song Ji-hyo ... Seo Yu-jin
Lee Dong-kyu ... Min Jae-il
Kang Shin-il ... Chief Oh
Kang Sung-jin ... Officer Lee
Jo Kyeong-hun ... Officer Chu
Jeong Myeong-jun ... Chief Kim
Park Cheol-ho ... Kwon Cheol-woo
Kwon Min ... Jong Chan
Jo Mun-hong ... Black King
Kim Jae-in
Lee Yu-jeong
Kim Hye-jin
Kim Ki-hwan ... member of organization

External links
 
 

2004 films
2004 action films
2004 crime thriller films
South Korean action thriller films
South Korean crime thriller films
South Korean mystery films
Police detective films
Films directed by Chang Yoon-hyun
Cinema Service films
2000s Korean-language films
2000s buddy films
2000s South Korean films